The Drwęca is a river in northern Poland.

Drwęca may also refer to the following places in Poland:
Drwęca, Greater Poland Voivodeship (west-central Poland)
Drwęca, Iława County in Warmian-Masurian Voivodeship (north Poland) 
Drwęca, Lidzbark County in Warmian-Masurian Voivodeship (north Poland) 
Lake Drwęca